Héctor Osberto Moreira Pérez (born 27 December 1987) is a Guatemalan international footballer who plays as a defender for Liga Nacional club Xelajú.

Career statistics

International goal
Scores and results list. Guatemala's goal tally first.

Honours
Municipal
Liga Nacional de Guatemala: Apertura 2019

References

External links 
 

1987 births
Living people
People from Escuintla Department
Guatemalan footballers
Guatemala international footballers
Association football defenders
Deportivo Zacapa players
Universidad de San Carlos players
Xelajú MC players
C.S.D. Municipal players